Trevor Marshall St. John (born September 3, 1971) is an American actor. He portrayed Todd Manning/Victor Lord Jr. on the ABC daytime drama One Life to Live, and has starred in various primetime shows and films. He is known for his performances in Patrick Wang's critically acclaimed independent drama films, In the Family and The Grief of Others.  St. John joined the cast of Roswell, New Mexico in 2019.

Career

St. John was born in Spokane, Washington, and raised in nearby Orchard Prairie, Washington. He attended Whitworth University on a jazz performance scholarship, where he played the drums. As a jazz percussionist, he has played with Gene Harris, Marshal Royal, Slide Hampton, and Bill Berry. In May 2003, he joined the cast of One Life to Live. In August 2022, it was announced that he was joining the cast of The Young and the Restless.''

Filmography

Film

Television

Nominations

See also
Todd Manning and Blair Cramer
Todd Manning and Téa Delgado

References

External links

1971 births
Living people
20th-century American male actors
21st-century American male actors
American male film actors
American male soap opera actors
American male television actors
Male actors from Spokane, Washington
Whitworth University alumni